Alcolapia latilabris, the wide-lipped Natron tilapia, is a species of small fish in the family Cichlidae. It is endemic to the hypersaline, warm Lake Natron in Tanzania. It lives near springs in the southern part of the lake. It has a relatively broad, downturned mouth, which separates it from the two other fish in Lake Natron, A. alcalica and A. ndalalani.

References

latilabris
Fish described in 1999
Taxa named by Lothar Seegers